Tacna is a census-designated place (CDP) in Yuma County, Arizona, United States. The population was 555 at the 2000 census, and 602 as of 2010. It is part of the Yuma Metropolitan Statistical Area.

History
By 1859, the Butterfield Overland Mail stagecoach company had opened the Antelope Peak Station at the foot of Antelope Hill.  A post office named Tacna was created following the building of the Southern Pacific Railroad in the 1870s, but did not last long.  The name Tacna subsequently only referred to a railroad siding serving as a watering station.  The town of Tacna was founded by Max B. Noah in the early 1920s, named after the railroad stop. At the time he sold the town in 1941, it contained a post office and a restaurant called Noah's Ark. After the town's sale, the post office was relocated four miles east, and the original railroad siding was renamed to Noah.

There is an apocryphal story that the name Tacna is derived from Tachnopolis, a Greek priest from California who is supposed to have settled amongst the native population.  This claim appears to be entirely an invention of Noah.

Geography
Tacna is located along Interstate 8 within the Mohawk Valley and just south of the Gila River. It is east of the Yuma Metropolitan Statical Area.

Climate

Demographics

At the 2000 census there were 555 people, 194 households, and 149 families in the CDP. The racial makeup of the CDP was 67% White, 1% Black or African American, 1% Native American, 1% Asian, 25% from other races, and 6% from two or more races.  51% of the population were Hispanic or Latino of any race.
Of the 194 households 37% had children under the age of 18 living with them, 66% were married couples living together, 7% had a female householder with no husband present, and 23% were non-families. 18% of households were one person and 9% were one person aged 65 or older.  The average household size was 2.86 and the average family size was 3.25.

The age distribution was 30% under the age of 18, 8% from 18 to 24, 26% from 25 to 44, 19% from 45 to 64, and 17% 65 or older.  The median age was 36 years. For every 100 females, there were 105.6 males.  For every 100 females age 18 and over, there were 97.4 males.

The median household income was $25,556 and the median family income  was $26,354. Males had a median income of $26,875 versus $23,750 for females. The per capita income for the CDP was $11,197.  About 22% of families and 25% of the population were below the poverty line, including 34% of those under age 18 and 14% of those age 65 or over.

References

Census-designated places in Yuma County, Arizona